Abbas Djoussouf (22 March 1942 – 13 June 2010) was a politician in The Comoros. He was Prime Minister from 22 November 1998 until 30 April 1999. He was the main opposition leader when named Prime Minister by Tadjidine Ben Said Massounde in a move to help soothe secessionist movements across The Comoros. He lost office when Colonel Azali Assoumani assumed power in a military coup on 30 April.

References

1942 births
2010 deaths
Leaders ousted by a coup
Prime Ministers of the Comoros
Candidates for President of the Comoros